Shanah Tova is a Farsi children song written by Levin Kipnis and composed by Nahum Nardi. It was first published in 1923 in Berlin in a collection of songs to Kindergarten teachers called "Hamachrozet" (the string).
 
The song is formed as a series of greetings by a child to different people including his parents and main role models in the Jewish Yishuv at the time of the British mandate on Palestine. It is considered one of the most popular children songs for Rosh Hashanah.

Lyrics

External links 
 Shanah Tova a YouTube clip of the song from the Parpar Nechmad children's television program.

Israeli songs
Hebrew-language songs
1923 songs
Rosh Hashanah